Sir Roderick Roy Wilson (10 August 1876 – 27 August 1942) was a British banker and politician, Conservative MP for Lichfield from 1924 to 1929, and appointed Knight Bachelor in 1929.  A portrait is in the National Portrait Gallery.

Wilson played cricket at minor counties level for Cheshire from 1909–1913, making six appearances in the Minor Counties Championship.

References 

1876 births
1942 deaths
British bankers
Conservative Party (UK) MPs for English constituencies
Knights Bachelor
UK MPs 1924–1929
English cricketers
Cheshire cricketers